Fabulous Lives of Bollywood Wives is an Indian reality television series. The show focuses on the personal and professional lives of Neelam Kothari, Maheep Kapoor, Bhavna Pandey and Seema Kiran Sajdeh (formerly known as Seema Khan), wives of Bollywood actors Samir Soni, Sanjay Kapoor, Chunky Pandey and Sohail Khan (divorced) respectively. The series debuted on 27 November 2020 on Netflix. A second season premiered on 2 September 2022.

Production

Development 

The idea of creating a reality series similar on the lines of Real Housewives, originated in 2018.

Cast

Main

Recurring

Guest 
Malaika Arora (season 1–2)
Karan Johar (season 1–2)
Arjun Kapoor (season 1–2)
Ananya Panday (season 1–2)
Janhvi Kapoor (season 1–2)
 Mozez Singh (season 1–2)
Gauri Khan (season 1–2)
Jacqueline Fernandez  (season 1)
Sidharth Malhotra  (season 1)
Amrita Arora  (season 1)
Ekta Kapoor  (season 1)
Raveena Tandon  (season 1)
Neha Dhupia  (season 1)
Angad Bedi  (season 1)
Sussanne Khan  (season 1)
Boney Kapoor  (season 1)
Natasha Poonawalla  (season 1)
Tusshar Kapoor (season 1)
Manish Malhotra (season 1–2)
Shah Rukh Khan (season 1)
Shweta Bachchan Nanda  (season 2)
Mehr Jesia (season 2)
Badshah (season 2)
Zoya Akhtar (season 2)
 Sima Taparia (season 2)
Bobby Deol (season 2)
Farah Khan (season 2)
Jackie Shroff (season 2)
Ranveer Singh (season 2)

Reception 
Debasree Purkayastha from The Hindu  stated "Maheep Kapoor, Neelam Kothari, Seema Khan and Bhavana Pandey star in this half-baked reality show that doesn’t have enough drama or wit to hold your attention". Devki Nehra from Firstpost wrote "Fabulous Lives fulfils the voyeuristic drive of watching people unlike us in action, but is bereft of the drama that we have come to associate with reality TV".

Jyoti Knayal from India Today added "The Fabulous Lives of Bollywood Wives is the latest cringe fest from Netflix. You will hate it, but you will probably still watch it". Saibal Chatterjee from NDTV shared her review stating "Fabulous Lives Of Bollywood Wives Review: It does not offer any meaningful glimpses into lives of the stars and their families in an exacting, unforgiving movie industry where those with the right surnames are like cats."

References

External links
 
 

Hindi-language Netflix original programming
Television series about families
Television shows set in Mumbai
Indian reality television series